Cloudboy or Cloud Boy may refer to:

the Stearman Cloudboy, an aircraft of the 1930s
Cloudboy, an electronic music group active from 1995 to 2003
Cloud Boy, a children's book published in 2006